Brynjulf Rivenes (July 4, 1874 – December 21, 1929), generally known as B. Rivenes, was a Norwegian-American architect practicing in Miles City, a city in sparsely settled eastern Montana.

Biography
Rivenes was born in Norway in 1874, and was educated there. In 1904, he and his brother David immigrated to the United States, settling in Glendive, Montana. In 1905, Brynjulf went to the state capitol in Helena where he worked as a draftsman for architect and engineer John Hackett Kent of Bell & Kent. He then returned to Glendive, where he and his brother established an architect's office.

After a brief practice in Glendive, Rivenes moved his office to Miles City in 1906, with David staying behind to operate the Glendive office as a branch. At the time, Miles City was undergoing a period of major economic growth, and Rivenes had the opportunity to design many of the new buildings that the expanding city required.

Rivenes practiced as an architect in Miles City until his unexpected death four days before Christmas of 1929. In order to raise money, what remained of the business was sold off.
Brynjulf Rivenes was buried in the Custer County Cemetery in Miles City.

Architectural works
 1908 - Olive Hotel, 501 Main St, Miles City, Montana
 1909 - First M. E. Church, 209 N. Kendrick Ave, Glendive, Montana
 1909 - Jackson Block, 808 Main St, Miles City, Montana
 1909 - Lorenzo W. Stacy House, 2206 Main St, Miles City, Montana
 1910 - George Foster House, 1912 Main St, Miles City, Montana
 1910 - Miles & Ulmer Building, 425 Main St, Miles City, Montana
 1910 - Y. M. C. A. Building, 24 N 8th St, Miles City, Montana
 1911 - Harry J. Horton House, 1918 Main St, Miles City, Montana
 1911 - Masonic Temple, 1049 Main St, Forsyth, Montana
 1912 - Forsyth High School, 917 Park St, Forsyth, Montana
 Demolished
 1912 - Masonic Temple, 909 Main St, Miles City, Montana
 1912 - Scandinavian Lutheran Church, 2 N Lake Ave, Miles City, Montana
 1912 - Smith Block, 811 Main St, Miles City, Montana
 1913 - Kenney Block, 612 Main St, Miles City, Montana
 1913 - Miles City Auditorium, 20 N 8th St, Miles City, Montana
 1913 - Washington School, 505 N Meade Ave, Glendive, Montana
 1914 - Glendive City Hall (included in Merrill Avenue Historic District), 300 S Merrill Ave, Glendive, Montana.
 1915 - Douglas & Mead Building (Remodeling, included in Merrill Avenue Historic District), 119-121 N Merrill Ave, Glendive, Montana
 Altered
 1915 - James Hunter House, 2216 Main St, Miles City, Montana
 1915 - Washington School, 210 N 10th St, Miles City, Montana
 1916 - First Presbyterian Church, 1401 Main St, Miles City, Montana
 1919 - Lambert School, 3rd Ave N, Fox Lake, Montana
 Demolished
 1925 - Sacred Heart R. C. Church, 316 W Benham St, Glendive, Montana
 1928 - First Christian Church, 1720 Main St, Miles City, Montana
 1929 - Johnson House, 2105 Main St, Miles City, Montana

Other works in the Merrill Avenue Historic District by Rivenes (with unknown dates) are:
Krug Building,
Rivenes-West Hardware Company Building,
First National Bank Building (since remodeled), and
Dion Brother Building (1910s remodeling).

See also
Merrill Avenue Historic District (Glendive, Montana)

References

Other sources
Guide to Historic Glendive'' (Montana Historical Society. 1998) 

1874 births
1929 deaths
People from Miles City, Montana
People from Glendive, Montana
Architects from Montana
Norwegian emigrants to the United States